Finders Keepers may refer to:
 Finders, keepers, an adage that asserts that someone who has found an object can keep it

Literature
 Finders Keepers (Will and Nicholas children's book), a 1951 children's book by William Lipkind 
 Finders Keepers?, a 2003 children's book by Robert Arnett
 Finders Keepers (Rodda novel), a 1990 children's novel by Emily Rodda, basis for the television show The Finder (see below)
 Finders Keepers: The Story of a Man Who Found $1 Million, a 2002 book by Mark Bowden
 Finders-Keepers – Finding and Keeping the Man You Want, a 1976 self-help book written pseudonymously by David Duke as James Konrad and Dorothy Vanderbilt
 Finders Keepers (King novel), a 2015 book by Stephen King
 Finders, Keepers (Saxena novel), a 2015 novel by Sapan Saxena

Film and TV

Film
 Finders Keepers (1921 film), a film starring Dorothy Bridges
 Finders Keepers (1928 film), a film based on a book by Mary Roberts Rinehart
 Finders Keepers (1952 film), an American comedy film directed by Fred de Cordova
 Finders Keepers (1966 film), a film starring Cliff Richard
 Finders Keepers, the soundtrack album by Cliff Richard, and the title song
 Finders Keepers (1984 film), a comedy film starring Michael O'Keefe and Beverly D'Angelo
 Finders Keepers (2014 film), a thriller/horror film starring Jaime Pressly
 Finders Keepers (2015 film), a documentary about a legal battle over ownership of a severed leg

Television
 Finders Keepers (1981 British game show), a 1981–1985 children's game show hosted by Richard Stilgoe
 Finders Keepers (American game show), a 1987–1989 children's game show
 Finders Keepers (1991 British game show), a 1991–2006 children's game show based on the American show
 Finders Keepers (Australian TV series), a 1991–1992 children's show
 "Finders Keepers", a "Honeymooners" sketch that aired on The Jackie Gleason Show
 "Finders Keepers" (Family Guy), an episode
 "Finders Keepers", an episode of Shining Time Station

Music
 Finders Keepers (band), a UK band featuring future members of Trapeze
 "Finders, Keepers", an album by Trine Rein

Songs
 "Finders Keepers" (You Me at Six song), 2009
 "Finders Keepers" (Mabel song), 2017
 "Finders Keepers", a song by the Beach Boys from Surfin' U.S.A.
 "Finders Keepers", a song by Chairmen of the Board
 "Finders Keepers", a song by Miriam Bryant

Others
 Finders Keepers (1985 video game), a 1985 game, first in the Magic Knight series

See also
 Finders Keepers, Lovers Weepers!, a 1968 film by Russ Meyer
 "Finders Keepers, Losers Weepers", a 1965 song by Elvis Presley